Brampton railway station may refer to:

Canada
Brampton GO Station, Ontario, a CNR line station serving VIA and GO passengers
 Three other railway stations have existed within Brampton's modern borders: Mount Pleasant GO Station, Bramalea GO Station, and the historic Brampton CPR Station

United Kingdom
Brampton railway station (Cumbria)
Brampton railway station (Suffolk)
Brampton railway station (Norfolk)
Brampton Halt railway station, Newcastle-under-Lyme
Pitsford and Brampton railway station, formerly known as Brampton, Northamptonshire